Zayne Anderson (born January 3, 1997) is an American football defensive back for the Buffalo Bills of the National Football League (NFL). He played college football at BYU, and signed with the Kansas City Chiefs as an undrafted free agent in 2021.

College career
Anderson played in 50 games at BYU despite redshirting with injuries for 2 seasons, compiling 162 career tackles (105 solo). Anderson has size and speed to play and played a number of positions and has been compared to former BYU star and Kansas City Chief Daniel Sorensen.

Professional career

Kansas City Chiefs
Anderson was signed as an undrafted free agent by the Kansas City Chiefs after going unselected in the 2021 NFL Draft. After being released with final cuts on August 31, 2021 Anderson was signed to the teams practice squad. Anderson was promoted to the active roster on December 14, 2021.

On August 30, 2022, Anderson was waived by the Chiefs and signed to the practice squad the next day. Anderson became a Super Bowl champion when the Chiefs defeated the Philadelphia Eagles in Super Bowl LVII.

Buffalo Bills
On February 17, 2023, Anderson signed a two-year contract with the Buffalo Bills.

References

External links
Kansas City Chiefs bio
BYU Cougars bio

1997 births
Living people
American football defensive backs
BYU Cougars football players
Buffalo Bills players
Kansas City Chiefs players
Players of American football from Utah